The Coginchaug River in Connecticut, with a watershed including 39 sq mi of forests, pastures, farmland, industrial, and commercial areas, is the main tributary of the Mattabesset River. The name "Coginchaug" comes from a local Native American name for the Durham area  and it was the original name for the town. It has been said to mean "The Great Swamp", and is a reference to the meadows found in the central part of town.

In 2006, the Coginchaug was among Connecticut's 85 waterways cited to be of "lower quality", in view of the elevated levels of bacteria, including E. coli. Currently, efforts are being made by the Natural Resources Conservation Service of the United States Department of Agriculture to reduce the number of bacteria introduced into the river from untreated sewage, sanitary sewer overflow, agricultural runoff, leaking septic tanks, etc.

Canoeing
The river has become a popular canoeing route. In 2006, it was considered safe for canoeing, though it is not safe for in-water activities like swimming. The main paddling route starts at Route 147 and continues downstream, north, through additional slow-moving waters and a swamp. There are many portages, including those at six dams and at Wadsworth Falls, the only major waterfall. Class II whitewater is possible before it flows into the tidal marsh of the Mattabesset River.

See also

List of rivers of Connecticut

References

External links
 Connecticut Explorer's Guide, online paddling map of the Coginchaug River

Rivers of Middlesex County, Connecticut
Connecticut placenames of Native American origin
Middletown, Connecticut
Middlefield, Connecticut
Durham, Connecticut
Tourist attractions in Middlesex County, Connecticut
Tributaries of the Connecticut River
Rivers of Connecticut